Section 37 of the Constitution Act, 1867 is a provision of the Constitution of Canada relating to the composition of the House of Commons, the lower house of the federal Parliament of Canada.

The Constitution Act, 1867 is the constitutional statute which established Canada.  Originally named the British North America Act, 1867, the Act continues to be the foundational statute for the Constitution of Canada, although it has been amended many times since 1867.  It is now recognised as part of the supreme law of Canada.

Constitution Act, 1867

The Constitution Act, 1867 is part of the Constitution of Canada and thus part of the supreme law of Canada.  It was the product of extensive negotiations by the governments of the British North American provinces in the 1860s. The Act sets out the constitutional framework of Canada, including the structure of the federal government and the powers of the federal government and the provinces.  Originally enacted in 1867 by the British Parliament under the name the British North America Act, 1867, in 1982 the Act was brought under full Canadian control through the Patriation of the Constitution, and was renamed the Constitution Act, 1867.  Since Patriation the Act can only be amended in Canada, under the amending formula set out in the Constitution Act, 1982.

Text of section 37 

Section 37 reads:
{{Bquote|Constitution of House of Commons in Canada37 The House of Commons shall, subject to the Provisions of this Act, consist of three hundred and thirty-eight members of whom one hundred and twenty-one shall be elected for Ontario, seventy-eight for Quebec, eleven for Nova Scotia, ten for New Brunswick, fourteen for Manitoba, forty-two for British Columbia, four for Prince Edward Island, fourteen for Saskatchewan, thirty-four for Alberta, seven for Newfoundland, one for the Yukon Territory, one for the Northwest Territories and one for Nunavut.Marc Bosc and André Gagnon (eds.), House of Commons Procedure and Practice (3rd ed., 2017), Chapter 4:  The House of Commons and Its Members — Composition of the House.}}

Section 37 is found in Part IV of the Constitution Act, 1867, dealing with the legislative power of the federal Parliament.

Amendments

When originally enacted in 1867, section 37 provided that there would be 181 members in the House of Commons:  82 for Ontario, 65 for Quebec, 19 for Nova Scotia, and 15 for New Brunswick.

Section 37 has been amended by implication several times since 1867. Each time a new province was added, the House of Commons was expanded, and eventually the federal territories also acquired representation in the House of Commons.  There have also been increases in the number of seats as the population of Canada has grown, according to the formula set out in section 51 of the Act. The wording of section 37 was not formally amended by those additions, but has been consolidated to the present wording by the federal Department of Justice in the online version of the Constitution Act, 1867'' and by the procedure and practice guide published by the House of Commons.

Purpose and interpretation

Prior to Confederation, what are now Ontario and Quebec were joined in the single Province of Canada, as Canada West and Canada East.  Each region had equal representation in the provincial Parliament.  The population of Canada West gradually surpassed the population of Canada East, leading to political discontent in Canada West, and instability in the government.  Agitation grew for "representation by population" (also called "rep by pop").  That became one of the driving forces for the Confederation movement, as the politicians from Canada West saw federation as a solution to the political instability, with each province to be represented by population in the lower house of the new federation.

The number of seats in the House of Commons has varied over time, as new provinces were added and the population grew overall.  The seats in the Commons are allocated according to the formula set out in section 51 of the Act.

Related provisions

Section 51(1) of the Act provides for the method of allocation of provincial seats in the House of Commons.

Section 51(2) of the Act provides for seats for the three territories in the House of Commons.

Section 51A of the Act provides for a minimum number of seats for each province.  It sets out the "Senate floor" rule:  each province is entitled to the same number of seats in the Commons which it has in the Senate, regardless of population shifts.

Section 52 of the Act provides that Parliament can increase the number of seats in the House of Commons, provided it respects the principle of proportionate representation of the provinces.

References 

Constitution of Canada
Canadian Confederation
Federalism in Canada